Grant Napear (born June 18, 1959) is an American radio personality who currently hosts his own podcast If You Don't Like That With Grant Napear. Before this he hosted The Grant Napear Show, at KHTK Sports 1140 in Sacramento, California where he was fired for tweeting "all lives matter" during the George Floyd protest. He was also the play-by-play announcer for the Sacramento Kings of the National Basketball Association (NBA), but resigned. He has been a guest host on The Jim Rome Show.

A section of Napear's radio show was "Grant's Rant", in which he furiously exclaims into the microphone about everyday things that irritate him, such as obese passengers on airplanes, stop lights at freeway on-ramps, and people asking him if he's ready for Christmas during the holidays. His signature phrase "If you don't like that, you don't like NBA basketball” became a household reference among Kings fans, and NBA fans in general.

Early life
Born in Syosset, New York, Napear graduated from Syosset High School in 1977 and earned his academic degree in broadcast journalism from Bowling Green University, where he also played lacrosse.

Broadcasting history

 1977–1981: Football, basketball and hockey play-by-play announcer for Bowling Green University
 1985–1987: Weekend sports anchor, WAND, Decatur, IL (No Contract)
 1987–1995: Sports director for KRBK-TV/KPWB (now KMAX-TV) Channel 31, Sacramento California (Fired)
 1988–2020: Sacramento Kings play-by-play television announcer (Resigned)
 1992–1994: Play-by-play announcer for the Sacramento Gold Miners (Contract Ended)
 1995–1998: Sacramento Kings play-by-play radio announcer (KHTK) (Fired)
 2000–2015: play-by-play announcer for the San Jose Sabercats (Contract Expired)
 2003: Oakland Raiders preseason television announcer (Fired)
 2011–2012: Sacramento Mountain Lions play-by-play announcer Source (Contract Expired)
 2020–present: If You Don't Like That With Grant Napear podcast

Views on race
Napear has been accused of racism by former players for the Sacramento Kings and has come under fire for defending Donald Sterling, the former owner of the Los Angeles Clippers banned from the NBA after making racist remarks. On May 31, 2020, after the start of the George Floyd protests, Napear was placed on leave by KHTK after he responded on Twitter to former Kings' player DeMarcus Cousins' question regarding Black Lives Matter with the phrase "All lives matter". Two days later, the station announced that they had fired Napear, and he announced he had resigned from his TV position with the Kings.

References

External links
Sacramento Kings Broadcasters Bios
A King's Story - Grant Napear is Living His Dream

United Football League broadcasters
1959 births
Living people
College basketball announcers in the United States
College football announcers
American sports radio personalities
American television sports announcers
Sacramento Kings announcers
Oakland Raiders announcers
San Jose Sharks announcers
Arena football announcers
Canadian Football League announcers
Bowling Green State University alumni
People from Syosset, New York
People from El Dorado Hills, California
Syosset High School alumni